Katleho Bala (born 31 December 1998) is a South African cricketer. He made his Twenty20 debut for Easterns in the 2017 Africa T20 Cup on 25 August 2017. He made his List A debut for Easterns in the 2017–18 CSA Provincial One-Day Challenge on 11 February 2018.

References

External links
 

1998 births
Living people
South African cricketers
Easterns cricketers
Place of birth missing (living people)